Jamel Zahiri (born 8 November 1985) is a former professional footballer who played as a forward.

Club career 
Zahiri made one appearance in Ligue 2 for Angers during the 2004–05 season.

Interanational career 
Born in France, Zahiri is of Moroccan descent. He holds both French and Moroccan citizenship.

References

Living people
1985 births
Association football forwards
Moroccan footballers
French sportspeople of Moroccan descent
French footballers
Ligue 2 players
Championnat National players
Championnat National 2 players
Championnat National 3 players
Angers SCO players
Villemomble Sports players
Red Star F.C. players
US Orléans players
Hassania Agadir players
US Ivry players
Trélissac FC players
FC Chartres players
FCM Aubervilliers players